The Willis Avenue station was an elevated rapid transit station of the Willis Avenue Spur that branched off of the IRT Third Avenue Line in the Bronx, New York City. It opened in 1886 and closed in 1924.

History

Willis Avenue station was opened on November 25, 1886 by the Suburban Rapid Transit Company as a connecting spur to the Harlem River and Port Chester Railroad's Harlem River Terminal Station. The HR&PC was chartered 20 years earlier and operated trains owned by the New York, New Haven and Hartford Railroad. The station was located next to the 133rd Street Yard, and served both the Second and Third Avenue line trains. The spur ran from the 129th Street Station in Manhattan across the Harlem River Bridge, thereby creating two separate transportation hubs on both sides of the Harlem River. Suburban Rapid Transit was acquired by the Manhattan Railway Company in 1891, and then by the Interborough Rapid Transit Company in 1902. By 1912, the station would also begin to serve the New York, Westchester and Boston Railway, an electrified commuter line serving the Bronx and southern Westchester County. Despite the name the railroad never actually reached Boston. For the next decade the station became a vital link not only for rapid transit commuters, but interurban, commuter rail, and intercity rail passengers.

The station was closed for IRT service on April 14, 1924, when a connecting pedestrian bridge was opened between the nearby Third Avenue El station at 133rd Street, although the Third Avenue Line continued to cross the Harlem River until 1955. The HR&PC was officially merged with the New Haven Railroad on January 1, 1927. Harlem River Station continued to serve the New Haven Railroad and New York, Westchester and Boston Railway until 1930 when the NYNH&H left, and was closed completely on December 31, 1937, when the NYW&B fell into bankruptcy.

See also
Harlem River Intermodal Yard

References

External links
Willis Avenue Spur images (NYCSubway.org)

IRT Second Avenue Line stations
IRT Third Avenue Line stations
Railway stations in the United States opened in 1886
Railway stations closed in 1924
Former elevated and subway stations in the Bronx
Port Morris, Bronx